Aaron Kraten is a mixed media artist from Costa Mesa, California .

Early life
Aaron Kraten was born March 15, 1974, in San Francisco, California. As a child, he moved to Huntington Beach in Southern California. As a teenager, Aaron was very interested in skateboarding and counter culture. After high school, he worked full-time jobs while establishing himself as an artist, taking jobs in factories and working a stint as a courier. He gained recognition in the early 2000s, and subsequently set up a studio in a Costa Mesa loft on the East side.

Work

Kraten is a mixed media artist, using found objects such as refrigerator doors and discarded windows to dismantled doghouses and old street signs as well as using nontraditional paint media such as correction fluid. He prefers to use his hands to work directly with the paint, giving a textured quality to the work; it is intriguing to note that brushes are never used in any of his pieces. Aaron is a self-taught artist.

One of his best known paintings is Coast 2007, It was entirely fingerpainted.

History
Kraten grew up in Huntington Beach, California and spent many of his formative years drawing in 100-page sketchbooks, a practice he continues to this day. In 1999, while Kraten was working as a Vespa motorcycle mechanic, he experimented with painting on found objects. Kraten's first sales emerged after starting to display work in the thrift store, Stateside, at The Lab Anti-Mall where he was employed at the time, and sold a fair amount of it.

Soon after, Kraten began submitting his work to galleries and museums in Southern California.  Kraten's work has been shown in museums such as the Laguna Art Museum; Museum of Contemporary Art, Los Angeles; and galleries such as Gallery 23; Gallery C; Seven Degrees; and Subject Matter. Kraten shows about four times a year and posts new work on his website often. Kraten has filled over 58 100-page sketchbooks and created over 350 paintings. In 2019 Aaron Kraten's art was featured in the video game Fortnite by Epic Games. He currently paints full-time.

Past exhibitions
 Orange County Museum of Art (OCMA) - Newport Beach, California (group exhibition) "10/10" October 11, 2002
 Gallery 23 - Costa Mesa, California (group exhibition) "Dee Dee Ramone" May 12, 2002
 The Camp - Costa Mesa, California (group exhibition) "Remix" June 27, 2003
 7 degrees - Laguna Beach, California (Solo exhibition) "Latest Works" September 1, 2003
 Laguna Art Museum - Laguna Beach, California (group exhibition) "21-art pack" October 13, 2003
 Gallery C - Redondo Beach, California (group exhibition) "Nine" July 29 - September 11, 2003
 Subject Matter - Costa Mesa, California (group exhibition) "Chapter 10" September 18, 2004
 The Kutting Room Gallery - Santa Monica, California (group exhibition) "Fontana Meets Kraten" October 2, 2004
 Wax Poetic - Burbank, California (Solo exhibit) "Latest Works" January 22, 2005
 Arena Gallery - Huntington Beach, California (Solo exhibit) "Latest Works" November 12, 2005
 Wax Poetic - Burbank, California (Solo exhibit) "Latest Works" January 22 - February 22, 2005
 Museum of Contemporary Art, Los Angeles - (group exhibit) "Fresh" June 4, 2005
 Venice Art Walk - Santa Monica, California (group exhibition) "This is Art" May 20, 2006
 Subject Matter - Costa Mesa, California (group exhibition) "Collabro" May 20, 2006
 Alpha Cult - Long Beach, California (Solo exhibition) "Exhibit A" August 26, 2006
 Gallery 1988 - Los Angeles, California (group exhibition) "I am 8bit" April 18 - May 19, 2006
 Think Space - Los Angeles, California (group exhibition) "pick of the harvest" September 8, 2006
 Alpha Cult - Long Beach, California (Solo exhibition) "Interdirectional" May 12, 2007
 Jack Flynn Gallery - Costa Mesa, California (group exhibition) "Urbanism" August 11, 2007
 The Pinch Gallery - Costa Mesa, California (group exhibition) "The White Album" August 27, 2007
 Alpha Cult - Long Beach, California (group exhibition) "21-art pack" October 13, 2007
 Koos Gallery - Long Beach, California (group exhibition) "Pop Music" December 15, 2007
 Laguna Art Museum - Laguna Beach, California (group exhibition) "100 Artist" February 9, 2008
 The Box Gallery - Costa Mesa, California (solo exhibition)  January 12, 2008
 Wax Poetic - Burbank, California (Solo exhibit) "Latest Works" March 22, 2008
 Swiv Gallery - Oceanside, California (group exhibition) "Keep" November 12, 2008
 Project Artist Gallery - Philadelphia, Pennsylvania (Group exhibition)  November 7, 2008
 Suite100 Gallery - Seattle, Washington (Group exhibition)  November 14, 2009
 The Box Gallery - Costa Mesa, California (solo exhibition)  January 17, 2009
 Halogen Gallery - Seattle, Washington (group exhibition)  June 10, 2009
 Neue Transit Studio - Santa Ana, California (solo exhibition)  June 10, 2009
 Neue Transit Studio - Santa Ana, California (solo exhibition)  June 10, 2010
 Rothick Art Haus - Anaheim, California (group exhibition) "Doll Haus" April 9 - May 7, 2011
 Art Wino - Richmond, Virginia (group exhibit) "G40 the Summit" March 1–30, 2012
 Museum of Contemporary Art - Los Angeles - (group exhibit) "Fresh" March 24, 2012
 Rothick Art Haus - Anaheim, California (group exhibition) "7 Deadly Sins" April 14, 2012
 The Brink Gallery - Missoula, Montana  (group exhibition) "On Deck" May 2, 2014
 Laguna Art Museum - Laguna Beach, California  (group exhibit) "California Cool" February 7, 2015
 Rivet Gallery - Columbus, Ohio  (group exhibition) "Be My Valentine" February 7, 2015
 Woot Bear Gallery - San Francisco, California (group exhibit) "Art on Guard" May 29, 2015

References

External links

Artist's Personal Website
Video Interview

Published works
OC Weekly Cover May 2001
OC Weekly Cover June 2001
Razor Magazine vol. 3 no. 3 March 2003, *Ramones article*
Razor Magazine vol. 3 no. 4 April 2003, *HP Lovecraft article*
Razor Magazine  vol. 3 no. 5 May 2003, *The Matrix article*
ISM Quarterly Cover May 2003
Happy Magazine 2004
ISM Quarterly Cover 2005
Peel Magazine  Issue 7 Winter 2007, *Trunk Article*
ISM: Untitled Love Project Book Issue 15 December 2009
OC Weekly See Creatures With Kraken and Kraten at the Box Gallery 2009
Label 228: A Street Art Project book by Camden Noir 2009
Hunt & Gather: discovering new art book by Tina Ziegler 2010
944 Magazine October 2010 *The Art Issue*
Billabong Stores Display Holiday 2010
Schwarz Auf Weiss VolumeII: Style Needs No Color book by Fromheretofame Publishing 2012
Newbrow: 50 Contemporary Artists book by Shane Pomajambo 2012

1974 births
Living people
Artists from San Francisco